Catherine Jane Whitney (born in Chicago, Illinois) is an American jazz singer, composer, and lyricist. She was a lyricist for trumpeter Freddie Hubbard.

Whitney learned about music as a child, since her mother, Dorothy Brady, made a living as a vocalist and bandleader in Chicago in the 1950s and '60s. Her stepfather was George E. Lescher, a pianist who played with the Spike Jones Band during World War II and was a longtime Chicago resident. In later years, he led the George Lescher Ballroom Orchestra.

Whitney began her professional jazz singing career in the early 1990s under the mentoring of Von Freeman, a tenor saxophonist in Chicago. Jerry Brown and Gloria Cooper have recorded her work and three songs (in collaboration with Curtis Fuller, Rodgers Grant, and Milton Sealey). In October 2010, New York jazz vocalist Suzanne Pittson recorded a rendition of Freddie Hubbard's song "Our Own" (based on "Gibraltar"), which contained lyrics by Whitney. She has collaborated with Johnny Griffin, Houston Person, Clifford Jordan, Stanley Turrentine, Ray Brown, and Pete Cosey. She is also a Broadcast Music Incorporated (BMI) affiliated writer.

She has worked with many Chicago musicians, including Von Freeman, John Young, Jodie Christian, John Bany, Richie Cole, Robert Shy, Tommy Muellner, Rusty Jones, Jose Valdes, Arnold Gitard, and Johnie Faren.

References

 Second Floor Music Co., New York, NY, "One Heart's Dream" lyrics by Catherine Whitney, music by Rodgers Grant, 1994, 1987
 Second Floor Music Co., New York, NY, "Sweet And True" lyrics by Catherine Whitney, music by Curtis Fuller, 1994
 Second Floor Music Co., New York, NY, "New York Dream" lyrics by Catherine Whitney, music by Clifford Jordan, 1994
 Hubtones Music Co., "First Light" lyrics by Catherine Whitney, music by Freddie Hubbard, 1994, 1971
 Hubtones Music Co., "Our Own" lyrics by Catherine Whitney, music by Freddie Hubbard, 1994
 "Sing JAZZ!" Various Vocal(Arranged by Dr. Gloria Cooper) / Published by Second Floor Music, distributed by Hal Leonard (Stock No.: HHL0074021)
 Chicago Tribune article "Jazz Heirs Freeman Shines Among Rising Stars" August 3, 1993|By Howard Reich, Tribune Arts Critic.

External links
 Official site

American women jazz singers
American jazz singers
Singers from Chicago
Living people
Year of birth missing (living people)
Jazz musicians from Illinois
21st-century American women